In Indian cinema, an item number or item song is a musical number inserted into a film that may or may not have any relevance to the plot. The term is commonly used within Indian films (Malayalam, Telugu, Tamil, Hindi, Kannada, Punjabi, and Bengali cinema) to describe a catchy, upbeat, often provocative dance sequence for a song performed in a movie. The main aim of an item number is to entertain movie-goers and to lend support to the marketability of the film by being featured in trailers. They are favoured by filmmakers as they afford the opportunity to pick potential hit songs from the stocks, since they do not add to the continuity of the plot. It is thus a vehicle for commercial success that ensures repeat viewing.

An actress, singer, or dancer, especially someone who is poised to become a star, who appears in an item number is known as an item girl (there are item boys as well). However, second-generation South Asian women are more commonly featured in item numbers than men.

In filmi Mumbai slang, the term item means a "sexy woman", thus the original sense of "item number" is a highly sensualized song with racy, dirty imagery and suggestive lyrics.

History

1930s1970s
Up to the 1970s, Hindi cinema often relied on a female "vamp" character – usually playing the role of a cabaret dancer, tawaif/prostitute/courtesan, or male gangster's moll – to provide musical entertainment deemed more risqué. While film heroines also sang and danced, it was the vamp who wore more revealing clothes, smoked, drank, and sang sexually suggestive lyrics. The vamp was portrayed as immodest rather than evil, and her dance performances were sexualized by male producers. The trend was started by Cuckoo in films like Awaara (1951), Aan (1952) and Shabistan (1951).

Item numbers had been featured in Bollywood from as early as the 1930s. Azoorie in the 1930s often performed item numbers; Cuckoo was the next popular item dancer in the late 40s. Her banner year was 1949 when she was featured in over 17 films performing dances. Actress and classical dancer Vyjayanthimala was the one that introduced the classical dance number in Hindi films with her debut film Bahar (1951). The mixture of classical plus contemporary was popularized by Vyjayanthimala in films such as Devdas (1955), Amrapali (1966), Madhumati (1958), Sadhna (1958), Sunghursh (1968) etc.

In the early 50s, Cuckoo introduced the Anglo-Burmese Helen as a chorus girl. In time Helen would come to be the most popular vamp of the late-50s, 60s and 70s, having had performed in scores of item numbers including such popular songs as "Mera Naam Chin Chin Choo" from the film Howrah Bridge (1958), "Piya Tu Ab To Aaja" from Caravan (1971), "Mehbooba Mehbooba" from Sholay (1975) and "Yeh Mera Dil" from Don  (1978) (the song's tune was used in Don't Phunk with My Heart), "O Haseena Zulfon Wali" from Teesri Manzil and "Aa Jaane Jaan" from Intaqam. In films like Gunga Jumna and Zindagi the actress performed semi-classical Indian dances in songs like "Tora man bada paapi" and "Ghungarwa mora chham chham baaje". A desi bar number, "Mungda" from Inkaar was also immensely popular. In addition to her skillful dancing, her anglicised looks too helped further the vamp image. Helen's dominance pushed other vying item number dancers like Madhumati, Bela Bose, Laxmi Chhaya, Jeevankala, Aruna Irani, Sheela R. and Sujata Bakshi into the background and less prestigious and low budget b-movies.

In the early part of the 1970s actresses Jayshree T., Bindu, Aruna Irani and Padma Khanna entered into what was Helen's monopoly. Another noted feature of this era was the "tribal and banjara" item numbers such as the one in the Dharmendra, Zeenat Aman and Rex Harrison starrer Shalimar. Such songs provided the necessary settings for the lead couple's love to bloom.

1980s1990s

Silk Smitha was part of several successful Item dance numbers in the 1980s Indian films. Around the 1980s the vamp and the heroine merged into one figure and the lead actress had begun to perform the bolder numbers. The craze for "tribal and banjara" item numbers were soon gave way to slick choreography. In the late 1990s, with the proliferation of film songs based television shows, film producers had come to realise that an exceptional way to entice audiences into theaters was by spending excessively on the visualization of songs. Hence regardless of the theme and plot, an elaborate song and dance routine involving spectacularly lavish sets, costumes, special effects, extras and dancers would invariably be featured in a film. It was asserted that this contributed highly to the film's "repeat value".

Madhuri Dixit is often considered to be the pioneer of the modern trend. In the late 1980s, the song "Ek Do Teen" was added to the movie Tezaab as an afterthought, but it transformed Dixit and made her a superstar. Her partnership with choreographer Saroj Khan has resulted in numerous hits including the controversial "Choli ke peeche kya hai" and "Dhak Dhak" (Beta). Soon after the release of the film Khal Nayak, there were press reports stating that people were seeing the film again and again but only for the song "Choli Ke Peeche Kya Hai" that featured Dixit.

Although there have been many songs that fit the descriptions of item numbers in the early and mid-1990s, the term itself was coined when Shilpa Shetty danced for "Main Aai Hoon UP Bihar Lootne" in the movie Shool. This is perhaps the first time the media actually referred to Shetty as an "item girl" and the scene as an "item number".

2000s
Since 2000, many top Hindi film stars now do item numbers, and many new women entering Bollywood find item numbers a more amenable shortcut to success, as opposed to more traditional roles with no guarantee of eventual stardom. Former item girls in pop songs outside films, Rakhi Sawant and Meghna Naidu, for example, are now in demand and very popular. Today, they are even being given lead roles in movies. As of 2007, Mallika Sherawat had become the most expensive item girl, charging Rs. 15 million (roughly US$375,000) for the song "Mehbooba O Mehbooba" in Aap Ka Suroor - The Real Love Story. Another example is actress Urmila Matondkar, one of the most successful item girls during that time. She was featured in "Chamma Chamma" in the 1998 film China Gate and "Tandoori Nights" in the 2008 film Karzzzz. Baz Luhrmann's 2001 film musical, Moulin Rouge! used a westernized version of this song.

Malaika Arora and Yana Gupta are "official" item number dancers and have said in interviews that they don't want to act in movies since they already earn more than enough money just by doing one item number as opposed to full-on roles.

Abhishek Bachchan became the first "item boy" with his performance in Rakht; Shahrukh Khan performed an item number of sorts during the opening credits of Kaal but later had an item number in a truer sense of the word with "Dard-e-disco" in Om Shanti Om, where he was shot in a more typical "item girl" manner, with Khan wearing minimal clothing (though this number did have a connection, albeit tenuous, with the plot of the film). In Krazzy 4, Hrithik Roshan has an item number during the end credits. Ranbir Kapoor made his debut in an item number in Chillar Party (2011); drawing inspiration from his father Rishi Kapoor's Qawwali song "Parda Hai Parda" from Amar Akbar Anthony. In 2005 and 2006 actress Bipasha Basu gave blockbuster hit numbers like No Entry and Beedi Jalaile.

In the 2007 Telugu film Desamuduru, the song "Attaantode Ittaantode" featuring Allu Arjun and Rambha became a chartbuster. In the 2007 film Om Shanti Om, the song "Deewangi Deewangi" had guest appearances by over 30 Bollywood stars. In 2008, the makers of Rab Ne Bana Di Jodi featured Kajol, Bipasha Basu, Lara Dutta, Priety Zinta, and Rani Mukerji playing five leading ladies opposite Shahrukh Khan in the song "Phir Milenge Chalte Chalte".

2010s
In 2010, Katrina Kaif featured in "Sheila Ki Jawani" from Tees Maar Khan, and Malaika Arora featured in "Munni Badnaam Hui" from Dabangg. Parallels were drawn between Katrina and Malaika, as well as between the item numbers, in what was popularly known as the "Munni vs Sheila" debate. The songs became so popular, that, soon, more films began incorporating item numbers, and with more top stars now wanting to do them.

In 2012, Katrina Kaif again featured in an item number "Chikni Chameli" sung by Shreya Ghoshal which became a huge hit. In 2013, Deepika Padukone had some success item dancing, performing songs like "Party On My Mind" and "Lovely". Priyanka Chopra did many songs such as " Babli Badmaash", "Pinky", and an appearance in Sanjay Leela Bhansali's Goliyon Ki Raasleela Ram-Leela song "Ram Chahe Leela", of which became a blockbuster upon release. Mahi Gill, Sonakshi Sinha, and Jacqueline Fernandez made their debut with "Don't Touch My Body", "Govinda Govinda" and "Jadu Ki Jappi" respectively.

Indian-Canadian actress Sunny Leone performed her first item dance with "Laila" from the 2013 film "Shootout at Wadala", followed up with Baby Doll from Ragini MMS 2. In 2017, Sunny Leone featured in the hit item number "Laila Main Laila" starring Shah Rukh Khan in the film Raees. It is a recreation of the song "Laila O Laila" from the 1980 film Qurbani, which featured actress Zeenat Aman with Feroz Khan in the original musical number.

In 2017, Anglo-Indian actress Amanda Rosario featured in the item number "Sarkar" sung by Rani Hazarika from the movie Udanchhoo.

In 2018, Pooja Hegde featured in the hit item number "Jigelu Rani" from the film Rangasthalam. The song was trending on YouTube. Moroccan-Canadian dancer-actress Nora Fatehi also featured in the item song "Dilbar" which has become one of the most popular Bollywood music videos of all time. It is a recreation of an item number of the same name from Sirf Tum (1999), which was composed by Nadeem–Shravan and featured Sushmita Sen as an item girl. The re-created version by Tanishk Bagchi features Middle-Eastern musical sounds. In the music video, Nora Fatehi performs belly dancing, an Arabic dance style that was previously featured in a number of popular Bollywood item numbers, performed by actresses such as Helen in "Mehbooba O Mehbooba" from Sholay (1975), Zeenat Aman in "Raqqasa Mera Naam" from The Great Gambler (1979), Mallika Sherawat in "Mayya Mayya" from Guru (2007), and Rani Mukerji in "Aga Bai" from Aiyyaa (2012). The international success of "Dilbar" inspired an Arabic-language version, also featuring Nora Fatehi. "Dilbar" is popular across Southern Asia and the Arab world, with all versions of the song having received more than 1billion views on YouTube.

TV and Bollywood Actress Mouni Roy made her debut by "Nachna Aunda Nahi". The "Gali Gali" track from the Kannada film K.G.F: Chapter 1, sung by Neha Kakkar, which featured Mouni Roy also, was a huge hit.

2020s 
In 2022, the "Oo Antava Oo Oo Antava" track sung by Indravathi Chauhan from the Telugu language film Pushpa: The Rise, which featured Samantha Ruth Prabhu, was a huge nationwide hit, despite the song being dubbed in all languages including Hindi, Tamil, Malayalam and Kannada .

Impact
On 21 July 2005, Indian parliament passed a bill to ban dance bars in Maharashtra. Criticizing the bill and supporting the dancers, Flavia Agnes said that bar dancing cannot be termed as vulgar, what they are doing is an imitation of what item girls are doing in films, they work there out of their own choice.

As one writer put it, "On paper, item numbers form the perfect formula for female sexual empowerment. In reality, they mostly result in the most blatant objectification. Camera angles zoom in over gyrating hips and linger over bare waists as blatantly as the eyes of the ogling men with no subtlety. The gaze in these dance numbers presents itself as vaguely voyeuristic, at best. There is a very deliberate implication present; that the item girl is not only inviting the leers and jeers, but she is also enjoying them."

In 2013, the Central Board of Film Certification issued a resolution declaring that item songs will now be rated as adult content and will not be allowed to be shown on television channels.

References

External links
 History of Item Girls in Tamil Cinema

Hindi cinema
Indian songs
Indian culture
Telugu cinema